West Tegal is a district in the city of Tegal, Central Java, Indonesia with a population of 242,539 (2014 Census). 

tegal
Districts of Central Java
Southeast Asia